In mathematics, an infinite expression is an expression in which some operators take an infinite number of arguments, or in which the nesting of the operators continues to an infinite depth.  A generic concept for infinite expression can lead to ill-defined or self-inconsistent constructions (much like a set of all sets), but there are several instances of infinite expressions that are well-defined.

Examples
Examples of well-defined infinite expressions are

 infinite sums, such as

 

 infinite products, such as

 

 infinite nested radicals, such as

 

 infinite power towers, such as 

 

 infinite continued fractions, such as

 
 where the left hand side uses Gauss' Kettenbruch notation.

In infinitary logic, one can use infinite conjunctions and infinite disjunctions.

Even for well-defined infinite expressions, the value of the infinite expression may be ambiguous or not well-defined; for instance, there are multiple summation rules available for assigning values to series, and the same series may have different values according to different summation rules if the series is not absolutely convergent.

From the hyperreal viewpoint
From the point of view of the hyperreal numbers, such an infinite expression  is obtained in every case from the sequence  of finite expressions, by evaluating the sequence at a hypernatural value  of the index n, and applying the standard part, so that .

See also
Iterated binary operation
Infinite word
Decimal expansion
Power series
Infinite compositions of analytic functions
Omega language

References

Abstract algebra
Mathematical analysis